The Misericordia Church, also known as the Cetate Greek Catholic Church, is a Greek Catholic church located in Timișoara's 700 Square. Dedicated to St. Joseph, the church belonged to the Order of the Misericordia (Latin for "mercy") and was built between 1748 and 1753. It is the second oldest church in Timișoara and houses the largest icon of St. Joseph in Romania as well as the oldest organ in Banat.

History 
Opposite today's 700 Square, the "Nepomuk brothers", a religious association in the city, built the city's first hospital and pharmacy in what was then Johannesgasse in 1735. Upon its completion in 1737, the hospital was taken over by the Order of the Misericordia (Black Penitents). They were a Catholic order with multiple activities in caring for the sick. The first six friars arrived in Timișoara from Belgrade in 1737, under the leadership of Vicar Paulinus Temel. The church, attached to the hospital, was built between 1748 and 1753, on the site of the former chapel of the Order of the Misericordia. It was designed by engineers Kaspar Dissel and Johann Lechner as a single-nave building with a semicircular vault in provincial Baroque style. It was consecrated on 19 March 1757. Following the bombings during the Hungarian Revolution, on 6–7 July 1849, the church was severely damaged, being rebuilt in 1851 – as a result, the Baroque appearance is largely lost.

In 1948, after the abolition of religious orders, the church was closed and used by the Museum of Banat as a depository of archeological pieces. After 1990, when the agreement for use was obtained from the rightful owners, the interior was renovated and arranged with the financial support of painter Alfons Vezoc, the works being executed by the team of engineer Ioan Pricop. The Roman Catholic Bishop of Timișoara Sebastian Kräuter and the representatives of the Order of the Misericordia decided in 1993 that the church should be donated to the Greek Catholics. The church was consecrated during the inaugural Holy Mass on 3 July 1993 by Ioan Ploscaru.

References 

Religious buildings and structures in Timișoara
Greek-Catholic churches in Romania
Historic monuments in Timiș County